The Horace Rackham Memorial Fountain (1939), also known as the Bear Fountain, is a fountain located in the Detroit Zoo, Royal Oak, Michigan. It was designed by Frederick A. Schnaple (1872–1948) and sculpted by Corrado Parducci.

The fountain consists of a large bowl supported by two standing bears—as well as several frogs, turtles and even a couple of seals—along with some granite putti on the outside of the fountain.

Mary Rackham, widow of the Detroit industrialist Horace Rackham, made several significant donations in his name, including the Horace H. Rackham School of Graduate Studies at the University of Michigan, the Rackham School at Eastern Michigan University and the Horace H. Rackham Building in the Cultural Center in Detroit. Horace Rackham had served as the first president of Detroit's Zoological Commission, and to commemorate his connection with the zoo Mary Rackham donated the funds to create the fountain.

Parducci's maquette for one of the bears has survived in the Detroit Historical Museum collection.

About this commission Parducci said, "I didn't like that. I made it against my will. They wanted, Mrs. Rackham was sold on that, bears  . . ."

References

1939 establishments in Michigan
1939 sculptures
Animal sculptures in Michigan
Bronze sculptures in Michigan
Buildings and structures in Oakland County, Michigan
Culture of Detroit
Fountains in Michigan
Monuments and memorials in Michigan
Outdoor sculptures in Michigan
Statues in Michigan
Tourist attractions in Detroit
Royal Oak, Michigan
Sculptures of bears